Roger Lee King is an American engineer currently a William L. Giles Distinguished Professor at Mississippi State University and is an Elected Fellow at the IEEE.

References

Fellow Members of the IEEE
Living people
21st-century American engineers
West Virginia University alumni
University of Pittsburgh alumni
Year of birth missing (living people)
American electrical engineers